St Christopher's Church, Springfield is a Church of England building in the Anglican Diocese of Birmingham.

History

The church was built by the architect Arthur Harrison in the Decorated Gothic style. It was consecrated in 1907, and a parish assigned out of St John's Church, Sparkhill in 1911.

Organ

The church has a two manual pipe organ by Ingram and Co of Hereford from 1936. A specification of the organ can be found on the National Pipe Organ Register.

References

Church of England church buildings in Birmingham, West Midlands
Churches completed in 1907
20th-century Church of England church buildings